Events from the year 1771 in Scotland.

Incumbents

Law officers 
 Lord Advocate – James Montgomery
 Solicitor General for Scotland – Henry Dundas

Judiciary 
 Lord President of the Court of Session – Lord Arniston, the younger
 Lord Justice General – Duke of Queensberry
 Lord Justice Clerk – Lord Barskimming

Events 
 17 August – Edinburgh botanist James Robertson makes the first recorded ascent of Ben Nevis.
 16 November – During the night, Solway Moss, on the Cumberland border, bursts, flooding local farms and settlements.
 26 November – First section of Monkland Canal opened.
 Encyclopædia Britannica First Edition completes publication in Edinburgh.
 Thomas Pennant's A Tour in Scotland, MDCCLXIX is published.
 Edinburgh Society of Bowlers codifies the modern rules for bowls.

Births 
 15 August – Walter Scott, poet and novelist (died 1832)
 11 September – Mungo Park, explorer (drowned under attack 1806 on the Niger)
 4 November – James Montgomery, poet, hymnist, editor and humanitarian (died 1854 in Sheffield)

Deaths 
 26 January – Sydney Parkinson, botanical illustrator (born c. 1745; died at sea)
 14 May – Charles Bruce, 5th Earl of Elgin (born 1732)
 17 September – Tobias Smollett, novelist (born 1721; died in Italy)
 William Lauder, literary forger (born c. 1680; died in Barbados)

The arts
 Henry Mackenzie's novel The Man of Feeling and verse The Pursuits of Happiness published.

See also 

Timeline of Scottish history

References 

 
Years of the 18th century in Scotland
Scotland
1770s in Scotland